Shorea stenoptera, called, along with some other species in the genus Shorea, light red meranti, is a species of tree in the family Dipterocarpaceae. It is endemic to Borneo and threatened by habitat loss.

References

stenoptera
Endemic flora of Borneo
Trees of Borneo
Taxonomy articles created by Polbot
Taxa named by William Burck